Villalbilla is a village in Spain. It is located in the east of the Community of Madrid, near the city of Alcalá de Henares. It had a population of 7,546 in 2005

References

External links
 The official site of the city 

Municipalities in the Community of Madrid